Acronicta dolli, or Doll's dagger moth, is a species of moth in the family Noctuidae (the owlet moths). It was first described by William Barnes and James Halliday McDunnough in 1818 and it is found in North America.

The MONA or Hodges number for Acronicta dolli is 9277.

References

Further reading

 
 
 

Acronicta
Articles created by Qbugbot
Moths described in 1918